Aztec Ace is a comic title formerly published by Eclipse Comics. Originally written by Doug Moench and pencilled by Dan Day, 15 issues appeared from 1984 to 1985. The series ended abruptly, leaving several storylines unresolved. The characters reappeared in the 1988 Total Eclipse crossover mini-series. 

Other contributors to Aztec Ace were inker Nestor Redondo, inker Ron Harris, artist Mike Gustovich, artist Tom Yeates, colorist Philip DeWalt, colorist Steve Oliff, colorist Sam Parsons, letterer Carrie Spiegle, and Eclipse editor cat yronwode. The Aztec Ace logo was created by Denis McFarling.

The story revolves around a time traveler named Ace (real name: Caza), whose goal is to save the timestream from unraveling through various intricate adventures. Ace is from the 23rd century, with his base in pre-contact Aztec Mexico; he often visits ancient Egypt. His main enemy is Nine-Crocodile, who creates time paradoxes in an attempt to save his own dimension at the expense of other realities, especially, the modern world as we know it.

Characteristics of the series are time travel, the use of cultural icons such as political figures, historical situations, songs, and cult movies in unexpected situations, and philosophical musing. Historical renderings of ancient cultures were detailed and imaginative. Careful reading, broad knowledge, and patience were required of the reader, as well as some understanding of the ongoing storyline, all of which possibly prevented it from gathering a large following.

References

External links
 
Sketchings of the Unfinished and Finished Versions of the Aztec Ace Logo
International Hero Catalog on Aztec Ace

1984 comics debuts
1985 comics endings
Comics by Doug Moench
Eclipse Comics characters
Eclipse Comics titles
Comics about time travel